Tillandsia malzinei is a species of flowering plant in the family Bromeliaceae, native to Mexico. It was first described by Charles Jacques Édouard Morren in 1874 as Vriesea malzinei.

References

BSI Cultivar Registry Retrieved 11 October 2009

malzinei
Flora of Mexico
Plants described in 1874